Les Terres-de-Chaux is a commune in the Doubs department in the Bourgogne-Franche-Comté region in eastern France.

Geography

Population

Sights and monuments
 The church of Saint-Léger was probably built in the 12th century. The nave and choir were altered in the 14th century. Side chapels were added in the 16th and 17th centuries and a sacristy to the south of the choir between 1760 et 1765. The choir contains murals from the 15th or 16th centuries. The church has been listed since 1936 as a monument historique by the French Ministry of Culture.

See also
 Communes of the Doubs department

References

External links

 Terres-de-Chaux on the regional web site 
 

Communes of Doubs